Pramod Maruti Mande (19 December 1954 – 17 October 2017), popularly known as Bhau, was an Indian historian and writer. He was rewarded as Durgamaharshi and Sahyadri Putra. He specialised in writing about the history of Indian forts and freedom fighters.

Works
Mande travelled widely for 40 years and surveyed more than 2,000 forts, believing that forts must be seen and observed to understand the work of Chhatrapati Shivaji Maharaj. He built up a collection of over 15,000 books on history, 3,000 slides and 200,000 photos of various forts, and more than 450 pictures and oil paintings of Indian freedom fighters.

He used to conduct two programs includes History of Shivaji Maharaj and Aazadi ke diwane. He travelled 2 times on the exact route of Rajgad to Agra and Agra to Rajgad, a route passed through seven states and over 1,000 kilometers on which Shivaji Maharaj had gone to Agra to meet Aurangzeb as per Treaty of Purandhar. He has delivered more than five thousands of lectures on Shivaji Maharaj to create interest about Shivaji Maharaj in younger generations. His 200 exhibitions on history talks about his works.

He was associated with many organisations working on history. These included:
 पुणे व्हेंचर्स Pune ventures
 श्री शिवाजी रायगड स्मारक मंडळ Shri Shivaji Raigad Smarak Mandal
 वडवानल प्रतिष्ठान Vadvanal Pratishtan
 भारत इतिहास संशोधक मंडळ Bhartiy itihas sanshodhan mandal
 लोकसेवा प्रतिष्ठान Lokseva pratishthan
 भक्तीशक्ती प्रतिष्ठान Bhaktishakti Pratishthan
 गडकिल्ले सेवा समिती Gadkille seva samiti

Books
 स्वातंत्र्य संग्रामातील अग्निशलाका Swatantrya sangramatil agnishalaka
 स्वातंत्र्य संग्रामातील अंगार Swatantrya sangramatil angar
 गड किल्ले महाराष्ट्राचे Gad kille Maharashtrache
 १११ क्रांतिकारकांचे संक्षिप्त चरित्र 111 Krantikarkanche sankshipt charitra
 स्वातंत्र्य संग्रामातील समिधा (चरित्रकथनात्मक) Swatantrya sangramatil samidha
 महाराष्ट्रातील रत्नभांडार Maharashtratil ratnabhandar

Personal life
Mande worked for Tata Motors. He took retirement after 22 years of service to concentrate on the research on forts.

Death
Mande died in Deenanath Mangeshkar Hospital, in Pune on 17 October 2017 due to illness at the age of 63.

External links
 https://www.youtube.com/channel/UC18WFt4VD57iXXs8VvaBbzg

References

1954 births
2017 deaths
Marathi-language writers
20th-century Indian historians
Writers from Pune